The Rocky Mount Metropolitan Statistical Area, as defined by the United States Census Bureau, is an area consisting of two counties – Edgecombe and Nash – in eastern North Carolina, anchored by the city of Rocky Mount. As of the 2010 census, the MSA had a population of 152,392. It is commonly referred to as the Twin Counties.

Counties
Edgecombe
Nash

Communities
Places with more than 50,000 inhabitants
Rocky Mount (Principal city)
Places with 1,000 to 15,000 inhabitants
Nashville
Pinetops
Red Oak
Sharpsburg (partial)
Spring Hope
Tarboro
Zebulon (partially)
Places with 500 to 1,000 inhabitants
Bailey
Dortches
Middlesex
Princeville
Whitakers
Places with less than 500 inhabitants
Castalia
Conetoe
Leggett
Macclesfield
Momeyer
Speed
Unincorporated places
Crisp

Demographics
As of the 2017 census estimate, there were 143,026 people and 57,083  households within the MSA. The racial makeup of the MSA was 45.7% White, 45.8% African American, 0.5% Native American, 0.6% Asian, 0% Pacific Islander, 0.1% from other races, and 1.5% from two or more races. Hispanic or Latino of any race were 5.8% of the population.

The median income for a household in the MSA was $42,784. The per capita income for the MSA was $23,320.

See also
North Carolina census statistical areas
List of cities, towns, and villages in North Carolina
List of unincorporated communities in North Carolina

References

 
Edgecombe County, North Carolina
Geography of Nash County, North Carolina
Metropolitan areas of North Carolina